Alex Hunter may refer to:

 Alex Hunter (footballer) (1895–1984), Scottish footballer
 Alex Hunter (character), a fictional character from the FIFA franchise by EA Sports
 Alex Hunter (economist) (1919–1971), Scottish-Australian industrial economist
 Alex Hunter, district attorney of Boulder, Colorado during the JonBenét Ramsey murder investigation

See also
 Alexander Hunter (disambiguation)